Hereford High School may refer to:

 Aylestone School, a school in Hereford, UK, formed by the merger of Hereford High School for Girls and Hereford High School for Boys
 Hereford High School, Parkton, a school in Maryland, USA
 Hereford High School (Texas), a school in Hereford, Texas, USA